Machimus setibarbus is a species of fly in the family Asilidae, the robber flies and assassin flies.

Distribution
This species is widespread in Europe (Bulgaria, Bosnia and Herzegovina, Denmark, Croatia, Germany, Finland, Greece, Italy, former Yugoslavia, Norway, Russia, Poland, Romania, Sweden, Switzerland, Spain, Czech Republic, Slovakia), North Africa (Tunisia), and in the Near East (Israel).

Description
These robber flies have a face beard with distinctly stout bristles and four-eight scutellar marginal bristles. Legs are entirely black, but sometimes knees are paler. Moreover front femur do not show ventrally distinct stout bristles, but only hairs.

References 

Asilinae
Insects described in 1849